James Ian Morrison (born 24 January 1985) is an English professional golfer.

Early life
Morrison attended Reed's School. He played in the same England youth cricket teams as Alastair Cook, Ravi Bopara and Tim Bresnan, with whom he remains friends.

Amateur career
At the age of 16, he switched to golf and his handicap fell from 18 to scratch in less than a year. He subsequently accepted a scholarship to the University of South Carolina.

Professional career
Morrison turned professional in 2006 and played initially on the PGA EuroPro Tour.

At the end of 2007, he played all three stages of Qualifying School and finished 44th, earning a regular place on the Challenge Tour.  He finished 18th in the 2009 Challenge Tour Rankings to secure his place on the 2010 European Tour.

In April 2010, he claimed his first win on the European Tour, winning the Madeira Islands Open BPI - Portugal, finishing on 20 under par. Three weeks later he finished second at the Open de España, having lost a playoff for the title to Álvaro Quirós.

In May 2015, Morrison won the Open de España by shooting a final-round 69 for his second European Tour victory. Later that year, he finished second at the Alstom Open de France, three shots behind Bernd Wiesberger.

In August 2021, Morrison recorded his best finish on the European Tour since 2015. He carded a final round 63 at the Hero Open to finish one shot behind Grant Forrest. Forrest birdied the final two holes to take the title from Morrison.

Personal life
Morrison has suffered from the chronic auto-immune condition Crohn's disease since his mid-teens.

Professional wins (2)

European Tour wins (2)

European Tour playoff record (0–1)

Playoff record
Challenge Tour playoff record (0–1)

Results in major championships

CUT = missed the half-way cut
"T" = tied

Results in World Golf Championships

"T" = Tied

See also
2009 Challenge Tour graduates
2013 European Tour Qualifying School graduates

References

External links

English male golfers
South Carolina Gamecocks men's golfers
European Tour golfers
People educated at Reed's School
People with Crohn's disease
Sportspeople from Chertsey
People from Weybridge
1985 births
Living people